Bolma fuscolineata is a species of sea snail, a marine gastropod mollusk in the family Turbinidae, the turban snails.

Description
The height of the shell varies between 7.8 mm and 9.4 mm, its diameter between 8.9 mm and 9.6 mm.

Distribution
This marine species occurs off French Polynesia and off New Caledonia.

References

 Alf & Kreipl (2009), An updated list of the Recent Bolma species (Gastropoda, Turbinidae) with a description of two new species from French Polynesia and New Caledonia; Novapex 10 (1) : 17–24|20 April 2010

fuscolineata
Gastropods described in 2009